Astrid Wanja Brune Olsen (born 23 June 1999) is a Norwegian tennis player. She has a Norwegian father and a Kenyan mother.

On 12 August 2019, Brune Olsen achieved her career-high singles ranking of world No. 880. On 3 February 2020, she peaked at No. 626 in the WTA doubles rankings.

Playing on the ITF Junior Circuit, Brune Olsen had a career-high ranking of 47, achieved in April 2017.

Since 2017, she has represented Norway in Fed Cup, where she has accumulated (as of December 2022) a win–loss record of 6–5.

National merit list
Champion ladies' singles: 2016
Champion ladies' doubles: 2016
Several Junior Champion titles, in singles and doubles.

ITF Circuit finals

Singles: 1 (runner–up)

Doubles: 8 (2 titles, 6 runner–ups)

Fed Cup/Billie Jean King Cup participation

Singles (1–0)

Doubles (1–1)

External links
 
 
 
 
 National matches and rankings

1999 births
Living people
Norwegian female tennis players
People from Nittedal
Norwegian people of Kenyan descent
Sportspeople from Viken (county)
21st-century Norwegian women